All the Women is a 2013 Spanish comedy-drama film directed by Mariano Barroso, starring Eduard Fernández based on the 2010 television series of the same name.

At the 28th Goya Awards, the film won Best Adapted Screenplay from a total of four nominations.

Cast
 Eduard Fernández as Nacho
 Lucía Quintana as Laura
 Michelle Jenner as Ona
 María Morales as Marga
 Petra Martínez as Amparo
 Marta Larralde as Carmen
 Nathalie Poza as Andrea

Awards

References

External links
 
 

2013 films
2010s Spanish-language films
2013 comedy-drama films
Spanish comedy-drama films
2010s Spanish films